Commentary on Cicero's Dream of Scipio (in Latin Commentarii in Somnium Scipionis) is a philosophical treatise of Macrobius based on the famous dream narrated in On the republic of Cicero (Chapter VI, 9-29).

In Cicero's work, Scipio Africanus appears to his adoptive grandson, Scipio Aemilianus, and reveals him his future destiny, and that of his country, explains the rewards that await the virtuous man in another life, describes the universe and the place of the Earth and of man inside the universe.

Macrobius does not offer an exhaustive comment of the text of Cicero, but expounds a series of theories on the dreams from neoplatonic background, on the mystic properties of the numbers, on the nature of the soul, on astronomy and on music. He quotes a number of authorities, but is unlikely to have read them all, or even the majority. Plotinus and Porphyry are his main sources, and he quotes frequently from Virgil with ornamental purpose. Nevertheless, the work incorporates ideas of neoplatonism that have not been preserved in a direct form elsewhere. The style is quite uneven, since Macrobius copies or translates his sources without unifying the style.

See also 
 De re publica
 Macrobius
 Cicero
 Neoplatonism
 Plotinus
 Porphyry

Bibliography

External links 

 Manuscript of Macrobius’ commentary on Cicero’s Somnium Scipionis from XII century. Royal Library of Danmark. Center for Manuscripts and rare books.

Ancient Roman philosophical literature
Rhetoric
Neoplatonic texts